March 1 - Eastern Orthodox liturgical calendar - March 3

All fixed commemorations below are observed on March 15 by Orthodox Churches on the Old Calendar.

For March 2nd, Orthodox Churches on the Old Calendar commemorate the Saints listed on February 17 (February 18 on leap years)'.

Saints

 Hieromartyrs Nestor the Bishop, and Tribiminus the Deacon, at Perge in Pamphylia (ca. 250)March 2/March 15. Orthodox Calendar (PRAVOSLAVIE.RU).
 Martyr Troadius of Neo-Caesarea, and those with him (251)Great Synaxaristes:  Ὁ Ἅγιος Τρωάδιος ὁ Μάρτυρας. 2 ΜΑΡΤΙΟΥ. ΜΕΓΑΣ ΣΥΝΑΞΑΡΙΣΤΗΣ.
 Virgin-martyr Euthalia of Sicily (252)Great Synaxaristes:  Ἡ Ἁγία Εὐθαλία ἡ Παρθενομάρτυς. 2 ΜΑΡΤΙΟΥ. ΜΕΓΑΣ ΣΥΝΑΞΑΡΙΣΤΗΣ.
 St. Cointus of Phrygia (Quintus of Phrygia), Confessor and Wonderworker (283)Great Synaxaristes:  Ὁ Ἅγιος Κοΐντος ὁ Μάρτυρας Ὁμολογητὴς καὶ Θαυματουργὸς. 2 ΜΑΡΤΙΟΥ. ΜΕΓΑΣ ΣΥΝΑΞΑΡΙΣΤΗΣ.
 Martyr Hesychius the Senator (the Palatine), of Antioch (ca. 304)Great Synaxaristes:  Ὁ Ἅγιος Ἡσύχιος ὁ Συγκλητικὸς. 2 ΜΑΡΤΙΟΥ. ΜΕΓΑΣ ΣΥΝΑΞΑΡΙΣΤΗΣ. (see also: May 10)
 Hiero-Confessor Theodotus, Bishop of Cyrenia in Cyprus (c. 326)Great Synaxaristes:  Ὁ Ἅγιος Θεόδοτος ὁ Ἱερομάρτυρας Ἐπίσκοπος Κυρηνείας Κύπρου. 2 ΜΑΡΤΙΟΥ. ΜΕΓΑΣ ΣΥΝΑΞΑΡΙΣΤΗΣ.
 Venerable Saints Andronicus and the Athanasia (5th century)March 15 / March 2. HOLY TRINITY RUSSIAN ORTHODOX CHURCH (A parish of the Patriarchate of Moscow).  (see also: October 9)
 Saint Agathon of Egypt, monk (5th century)Venerable Agathon of Egypt. OCA - Lives of the Saints.

Pre-Schism Western saints

 Martyrs of Rome, a large number of martyrs martyred in Rome under Alexander Severus and the prefect Ulpian (219)Rev. Sabine Baring-Gould (M.A.). "SS. MARTYRS UNDER ALEXANDER. (CIRC. A.D. 219.)." In: The Lives of the Saints. Volume the Third: March. London: John C. Nimmo, 1897. p. 21. 
 Saints Jovinus and Basileus, two martyrs who suffered in Rome under Gallienus and Valerian, buried on the Latin Way (258)
 Saints Paul, Heraclius, Secundilla and Januaria, martyrs who suffered under Diocletian at Porto Romano at the mouth of the Tiber in Italy (305)
 Saint Gistilian (Gistlian), uncle of St David and a monk at Menevia, or St Davids, in Wales (5th-6th centuries)
 Saint Joavan, a Romano-Briton who went to Brittany to live with his uncle St Paul of Léon, by whom he was consecrated bishop (ca. 570)Rev. Sabine Baring-Gould (M.A.). "S. JOAVAN, P. C. (6TH CENT.)." In: The Lives of the Saints. Volume the Third: March. London: John C. Nimmo, 1897. p. 22.
 440 Martyrs slain by the Lombards in Italy (Martyrs of Campania)  (ca. 579)Rev. Sabine Baring-Gould (M.A.). "SS. MARTYRS UNDER THE LOMBARDS. (CIRC. A.D. 579.)." In: The Lives of the Saints. Volume the Third: March. London: John C. Nimmo, 1897. p. 23.
 Saint Fergna, called 'the White', a relative and disciple of St Columba of Ireland, Abbot of Iona (637)Very Rev. John O'Hanlon. "Article IV.—St. Fergna Britt, Abbot of Iona. [Sixth and Seventh Centuries.]." In: Lives of the Irish Saints: With Special Festivals, and the Commemorations of Holy Persons. VOL. III. Dublin, 1875. pp. 91-92.
 Saint Chad (Ceadda), Bishop of Lichfield, England (672)Rev. Sabine Baring-Gould (M.A.). "S. CHAD, B. OF LICHFIELD. (A.D. 672.)." In: The Lives of the Saints. Volume the Third: March. London: John C. Nimmo, 1897. pp. 23-37.
 Saint Cynibil (Cynibild), a brother of Sts Chad and Cedd who helped enlighten England (7th century)
 Saint Willeic, a disciple of St Swithbert who made him Abbot of Kaiserwerth in Germany (726)Very Rev. John O'Hanlon. "Article X.—St. Villeic or Willeic, Priest, at Kaiserwerth, on the Rhine. [Seventh and Eighth Centuries.]." In: Lives of the Irish Saints: With Special Festivals, and the Commemorations of Holy Persons. VOL. III. Dublin, 1875. pp. 96-97.
 Saint Slebhene (Sléibíne mac Congaile), a monk from Ireland, he became Abbot of Iona in Scotland (767)Very Rev. John O'Hanlon. "Article VII.—St. Slebhene, or Slebhine, Abbot of Iona. [Eighth Century.]." In: Lives of the Irish Saints: With Special Festivals, and the Commemorations of Holy Persons. VOL. III. Dublin, 1875. p. 94.

Post-Schism Orthodox saints

 Venerable Arsenius, Bishop of Tver (1409)Great Synaxaristes:  Ὁ Ἅγιος Ἀρσένιος Ἐπίσκοπος Τβὲρ τῆς Ρωσίας. 2 ΜΑΡΤΙΟΥ. ΜΕΓΑΣ ΣΥΝΑΞΑΡΙΣΤΗΣ.
 Venerable Sabbatius, monk of Tver (1434), and his disciple St. Euphrosynus (1460)The Monk Evphrosyn. HOLY TRINITY RUSSIAN ORTHODOX CHURCH (A parish of the Patriarchate of Moscow).
 Venerable Barsanuphius (1459) and Sabbas (1467), Abbots of Tver.
 Venerable Abramios of Spassk, of the monastery of Christ the Saviour, Russia (16th century)
 New Martyr Theodore Sladić of Komogovina (1788)
 Venerable Joachim (Papoulakis) of Ithaca, monk of Vatopedi (Mt. Athos) and Ithaca (1868)
 Saint Ambrose (Khelaia) the Confessor, Catholicos-Patriarch of All Georgia (1927) (see also: March 16 and March 27)
 Saint Nicholas Planas of Athens (1932)Great Synaxaristes:  Ὁ Ἅγιος Νικόλαος ὁ Πλανᾶς. 2 ΜΑΡΤΙΟΥ. ΜΕΓΑΣ ΣΥΝΑΞΑΡΙΣΤΗΣ. (see also: February 17)

Other commemorations

 Repose of Abbess Philareta of Ufa (1890)
 Appearance of the Kolomenskoye “Reigning” Icon of the Most Holy Theotokos (1917)Great Synaxaristes:  Σύναξις Ὑπεραγίας Θεοτόκου τῆς Ἐνθρόνου. 2 ΜΑΡΤΙΟΥ. ΜΕΓΑΣ ΣΥΝΑΞΑΡΙΣΤΗΣ.

Icon gallery

Notes

References

Sources 
 March 2/March 15. Orthodox Calendar (PRAVOSLAVIE.RU).
 March 15 / March 2. HOLY TRINITY RUSSIAN ORTHODOX CHURCH (A parish of the Patriarchate of Moscow).
 March 2. OCA - The Lives of the Saints.
 The Autonomous Orthodox Metropolia of Western Europe and the Americas (ROCOR). St. Hilarion Calendar of Saints for the year of our Lord 2004. St. Hilarion Press (Austin, TX). p. 19.
 March 2. Latin Saints of the Orthodox Patriarchate of Rome.
 The Roman Martyrology. Transl. by the Archbishop of Baltimore. Last Edition, According to the Copy Printed at Rome in 1914. Revised Edition, with the Imprimatur of His Eminence Cardinal Gibbons. Baltimore: John Murphy Company, 1916. p. 63.
 Rev. Richard Stanton. A Menology of England and Wales, or, Brief Memorials of the Ancient British and English Saints Arranged According to the Calendar, Together with the Martyrs of the 16th and 17th Centuries. London: Burns & Oates, 1892. pp. 95–98.

Greek Sources
 Great Synaxaristes:  2 ΜΑΡΤΙΟΥ. ΜΕΓΑΣ ΣΥΝΑΞΑΡΙΣΤΗΣ.
  Συναξαριστής. 2 Μαρτίου.'' ECCLESIA.GR. (H ΕΚΚΛΗΣΙΑ ΤΗΣ ΕΛΛΑΔΟΣ).

Russian Sources
  15 марта (2 марта). Православная Энциклопедия под редакцией Патриарха Московского и всея Руси Кирилла (электронная версия). (Orthodox Encyclopedia - Pravenc.ru).
  2 марта (ст.ст.) 15 марта 2013 (нов. ст.). Русская Православная Церковь Отдел внешних церковных связей. (DECR).

March in the Eastern Orthodox calendar